Esterri d'Àneu is a municipality in the comarca of the Pallars Sobirà in Catalonia, Spain. It is situated on the right bank of the Noguera Pallaresa river above the reservoir of La Torrassa. It is linked to Sort by the C-147 road. It is the site of a hydroelectric power station.

References

 Panareda Clopés, Josep Maria; Rios Calvet, Jaume; Rabella Vives, Josep Maria (1989). Guia de Catalunya, Barcelona: Caixa de Catalunya.  (Spanish).  (Catalan).

External links
Official website 
 Government data pages 

Municipalities in Pallars Sobirà
Populated places in Pallars Sobirà